Francis William Howard (June 21, 1867 – January 18, 1944) was an American prelate of the Roman Catholic Church. He served as Bishop of Covington from 1923 until his death in 1944.

Biography
The fifth of seven children, Francis Howard was born in Columbus, Ohio, to Francis and Catherine (née O'Sullivan) Howard, who were Irish immigrants. After attending St. Joseph Academy in Columbus, he entered Our Lady of the Angels Seminary at Niagara, New York in 1884, and later returned to Ohio in 1888 to continue his studies at Mount St. Mary's Seminary of the West in Cincinnati. Howard was ordained to the priesthood  for the Diocese of Columbus by Bishop John Ambrose Watterson on June 16, 1891. In 1901 he organized the first Columbus Diocesan School Board. He also served as secretary (1904–1928), president (1928–1936), and member of the advisory board (1936–1944) of the National Catholic Educational Association.

On March 26, 1923, Howard was appointed the fifth Bishop of Covington, Kentucky, by Pope Pius XI. He received his episcopal consecration on the following July 15 from Archbishop Henry K. Moeller, with Bishops James Joseph Hartley and John A. Floersh serving as co-consecrators. During his 20-year tenure, he became a nationally recognized leader in Catholic education and established a strong system of Catholic grade schools and high schools a priority for the diocese. He was named an Assistant at the Pontifical Throne in 1928. Following the 1937 Ohio River flood, he opened all Catholic churches in Covington for relief purposes.

Howard died of heart disease in Covington on January 18, 1944. He is buried at St. Mary Cemetery in Fort Mitchell.

References

External links

Episcopal succession

Religious leaders from Ohio
1867 births
1944 deaths
The Athenaeum of Ohio alumni
People from Columbus, Ohio
Roman Catholic Diocese of Columbus
Roman Catholic bishops of Covington
Catholics from Ohio
Contributors to the Catholic Encyclopedia